Lola Montez is a 1918 German silent historical film directed by Robert Heymann and starring Alfred Abel, Leopoldine Konstantin and Helga Lassen. It portrays the life of Lola Montez. It was followed by a sequel in 1919 with a different actress playing the title role.

The film's art direction was by August Rinaldi.

Plot summary

Cast
 Alfred Abel as Räuber - Madons, Karlistenführer  
 Leopoldine Konstantin as Lola Montez  
 Helga Lassen as Anita, Lolas Kammermädchen  
 Bodo Serp as Riccardo, Mitglied der Bande Madons  
 Inge Törnquist as Pepita, Lolas Kammermädchen  
 Ito Waghalter as Marquis de Bocheville, französischer Attaché  
 Hans Wassmann as Sir Eduards, englischer Gesandter - Attaché  
 Hugo Werner-Kahle as Don Espartero, Regent von Spanien  
 Maria Zelenka

References

Bibliography
 Richter, Simon. Women, Pleasure, Film: What Lolas Want. Palgrave Macmillan, 2013.

External links
 

1918 films
German silent feature films
Films of the German Empire
Films set in the 19th century
Cultural depictions of Lola Montez
German black-and-white films
German historical films
1910s historical films
1910s German films